Anji is an Indian cinematographer, who is working in the Telugu, Kannada, Malayalam and Tamil film industries.

Career
Anji made his debut as a cinematographer in films with The Angrez (2005), before working on a series of Telugu films until 2009. He then moved to Chennai and worked on Tamil projects including Odipolama (2009) and Thambi Vettothi Sundaram (2011).

In the mid 2010s, Anji associated with Ram Gopal Varma during his return to Telugu films and worked on the productions of his Ice Cream franchise. For the projects, he experimented with the flow cam system for the first time. He also worked on the production of a Russo-Indian film, Ueban during 2013.

Filmography

 The Angrez (2005)
 Seetha Ramudu (2006)
 Tata Birla Madhyalo Laila (2006)
 Maa Iddari Madhya (2006)
 Call Centre (2006)
 Indrajith (2007)
 Sathyabhama (2007)
 Pelli Kani Prasad (2008)
 Nee Navve Chalu (2008)
 Sathu (2008)
 Alalu (2009)
 Odipolama (2009)
 Vallakottai (2010)
 Sattapadi Kutram (2011)
 Thambi Vettothi Sundaram (2011)
 Cinemakeldam Randi (2012)
 Shoki (2012)
 Ueban (2013)
 Ice Cream (2014)
 Erra Bus (2014)
 Ice Cream 2 (2014)
 Pokkiri Raja (2016)
 Attack (2016)
 Jeyikkira Kuthira (2017)
 Machan (2017)
 Tholisariga (2017)
 Burrakatha (2016)
 PSV Garuda Vega (2017)
 Seizer (2017)
 Dinchak Dinchak (2017)
 Oru Thekkan Kavyam (2017)
 Natakam (2018)
 Ugram (2018)
 Parari (2018)
 Evaru Aa Pilla Em Aa Katha (2018)
 Raagala 24 Gantallo (2019)
 Kadhal (2019)
 S5 No Exit  (2019)
 M M O F  (2019)
 Theerpugal Virkapadum (2021)
  The Rose Villa (2021) 
  Mugguru Monagallu  (2021)
  Mera Naam Sholay (2021)
  Oh Varsham Kurisina Rathri (2021)
  10th Class Diaries (2022)
  Bujji Ila Raa (2022)

References

External links
 

Living people
Tamil film cinematographers
Telugu film cinematographers
Year of birth missing (living people)
Cinematographers from Andhra Pradesh
Kannada film cinematographers